The University of Batna 1 (also named Université Colonel Hadj Lakhdar, Arabic: جامعة باتنة) is a public university in the city of Batna, Algeria. The university was originally created in 1977 as the University of Batna, before being split in 2005 into the University of Batna 1 and the University of Batna 2. It has four faculties and over 19,000 students.

See also
 List of universities in Algeria
 Batna City

References

External links
University of Batna website

 
1977 establishments in Algeria
Batna
Buildings and structures in Batna Province